Afolabi Oladimeji Julius (born 27 November 1994) is a Nigerian footballer who plays as a forward for Cafetaleros de Tapachula.

References

External links
 

1997 births
Living people
Nigerian footballers
Association football forwards
Ascenso MX players
Chiapas F.C. footballers
Cafetaleros de Chiapas footballers